Kiaram (also Romanized as Kīārām and Keyārām) is a village in Nilkuh Rural District in the Central District of Galikash County, Golestan Province, Iran. At the 2006 census, its population was 262, in 67 families.

References 

Populated places in Galikash County